The 2014 Avon Tyres British GT season was the 22nd season of the British GT Championship. The season began on 19 April at Oulton Park and finished on 14 September at Donington Park, after ten rounds held over seven meetings. Ecurie Ecosse driver Marco Attard won the GT3 championship, while Ross Wylie and Jake Giddings took the GT4 championship for Beechdean Motorsport.

Entry list

Race calendar and results
The provisional 2014 calendar was announced on 5 October 2013. Spa-Francorchamps replaced Zandvoort as the overseas round. All races except Belgian round at Spa, were held in the United Kingdom.

Championship standings
Points system
Points are awarded as follows:

Drivers' championships

GT3

GT4

Teams' championships

GT3

GT4

References

External links
 

	

British GT Championship seasons
GT Championship